Isernia Cathedral (Cattedrale di San Pietro Apostolo) is a Roman Catholic cathedral in the city of Isernia, Italy, the seat of the Bishop of Isernia-Venafro. It is dedicated to the Apostle Peter. The cathedral is situated in the Piazza Andrea in the old town of Isernia, and stands on the site of an Italic pagan temple of the 3rd century B.C. Construction of the present building began in 1349. Its present appearance is the result of many renovations, occasioned partly by numerous earthquakes and partly by building refurbishments.

Bibliography
 Bandinelli, Ranuccio Bianchi, and Torelli, Mario, 1976: L'arte dell'antichità classica, Etruria-Roma. Torino: Utet
 Catalano, Dora, 2001: Itinerari: La città antica, in: D. Catalano, N. Paone, C. Terzani, Isernia, pp. 97–115. Isernia: Cosmo Iannone Editore
 Damiani, Pasquale, 2003: Palazzi e Chiese della Città di Isernia, pp. 125–131. Venafro: Edizioni Vitmar

Sources and external links

Roman Catholic cathedrals in Italy
Cathedrals in Molise
Churches in the province of Isernia
14th-century Roman Catholic church buildings in Italy